Húsavík is an old village located on the east of the island of Sandoy, in Húsavík Municipality, Faroe Islands. 
 
In the centre of Húsavík there is a ruin called ‘Heimi á Garði’. It is said to be the remains of a farm that was built by the 'Lady of the House in Húsavík'. She was a strict and wealthy lady who lived in the 14th century. She owned all the land in Húsavík and also had some properties in Norway. Legend has it that she buried two servants alive. It is also said that she got all her wealth when she sold a golden horn to the King. The story goes that she found the golden horn in the ground, after dreaming of its location.

Image gallery

See also
 List of towns in the Faroe Islands

External links

Faroeislands.dk: Húsavík Images and description of all cities on the Faroe Islands.

Populated places in the Faroe Islands
Sandoy